was a Japanese fencer and author of the Kensetsu ("Discourse on Swords"). He founded the Chukō Shingan Ryū, an offshoot of the Shingan school, and emphasised the use of a shorter-than-normal sword. Gyozo is credited with developing the concept of the bugei juhappan (the "eighteen martial arts").

See also 
 Ninja-Russia relations

References

Japanese writers of the Edo period
1759 births
1828 deaths
Japanese male fencers